was a Japanese urologist and a co-author of 41 peer-reviewed articles all of which can be found on Web of Science and PubMed. He was also a President of the University of Tokushima.

References

1944 births
2021 deaths
Japanese urologists
Place of birth missing